Duke of Chicago is a 1949 film released in the United States by Republic Pictures and starring Tom Brown, Audrey Long and DeForest Kelley. Directed by George Blair, the film portrays a retired boxer, Jimmy Brody (Brown), who leaves his boxing career for his fiancée but is lured back into a one-off fight against a current champion due to financial difficulties.

Based on the 1933 novel The Duke Comes Back by Lucian Cary, Duke of Chicago was one of several films made on the back of the critical and commercial success of boxing pictures Body and Soul and Champion. However, the film was largely panned by critics, described as "slow-paced and seemingly a lot longer than its fifty-nine minutes."

Plot
Chicago former boxing champion Jim Brody is lured from his retirement and loving relationship with fiancée Helene back to the ring to face the current champion, Steve "Killer" Bronski.

Brody's financial difficulties and failing private business have left him desperate for money, with Helene leaving on their planned cruise around the world without him in anger at his attempts to cancel it. He accepts the fight with the financial assistance of gangster Tony Russo. Helene, learning this, ends her relationship with Brody via letter, but it is intercepted by an associate of Brody before it reaches him.

Russo pressures Brody to throw the fight for financial gain through the bookies. Brody achieves eventual victory, though being badly beaten during the fight. He is later assaulted and nearly murdered by Russo's men while recuperating in hospital. Russo and his gang are arrested. Brody, now without Helene, falls for and becomes engaged to her sister, Jane.

Cast
Tom Brown as Jimmy Brody
Audrey Long  as Jane Cunningham
Grant Withers as Tony Russo
DeForest Kelley as Ace Martin
Lois Hall as Helene Cunningham

Notes

References

External links
 

1949 films
1940s sports films
American boxing films
1949 drama films
Republic Pictures films
Films directed by George Blair
American sports drama films
American black-and-white films
1940s English-language films
1940s American films